Thomas Bowles Shannon (September 21, 1827 – February 21, 1897) was a California merchant and politician who served as member of the California State Assembly and the U.S. House of Representatives for California.

Early life
Shannon was born on September 21, 1827 in Westmoreland County, Pennsylvania. He attended the Westmoreland County public schools. He moved to Illinois in 1844 and by 1849 he moved during the California Gold Rush, to California. There he engaged in mining and mercantile pursuits in Plumas County in California.

Early political career
Shannon was originally a Whig in politics, but later supported the Free Soil wing of the Democratic Party, serving as a member of the California Central Committee in 1860. He subsequently switched to the Republican Party. He was a member of the California State assembly in 1859, 1860, and 1862, representing Plumas County. He supported black testimony in the California courts in 1862 and 1863, a position the Democrats unsuccessfully used against him as an issue in his third campaign for the Assembly and his subsequent campaign for Congress.

Running as a supporter of Senator John Conness, Shannon was elected as a Republican to the Thirty-eighth Congress (March 4, 1863 – March 3, 1865), in which he served as chairman of the Committee on Expenditures in the Department of the Interior. As a congressman he participated little in debate, but voted consistently for administration measures. Due to political turmoil in California over Conness, Shannon was not a candidate for reelection in 1864. He was selected as a California Congressional delegate for the Lincoln funeral, in which capacity he participated in speeches delivered outside the capital building in Columbus, Ohio.

Later career
Shannon was appointed surveyor at the port of San Francisco on August 11, 1865, and served until March 16, 1870. He was again a member of the State Assembly, representing San Francisco, in 1871 and 1872, serving as the Speaker of the Assembly the first year.

He was appointed by President Grant appointed him Collector of Customs at San Francisco, which he served as from July 1, 1872, to August 10, 1880, after which he resumed his mercantile pursuits.

Death and burial
Shannon died in San Francisco, California on February 21, 1897. His body was originally buried in the Masonic Cemetery, but reburied in 1931 at Woodlawn Memorial Park Cemetery in Colma, California.

References 

Congressional Biography 

1827 births
1897 deaths
Republican Party California state senators
Republican Party members of the California State Assembly
People of California in the American Civil War
Speakers of the California State Assembly
Republican Party members of the United States House of Representatives from California
19th-century American politicians
Burials at Woodlawn Memorial Park Cemetery (Colma, California)
Burials at Masonic Cemetery (San Francisco)